Aydilge Sarp (born June 25, 1979) is a Turkish writer, poet and singer-songwriter.

Biography
Aydilge Sarp was born in 1979 in Kütahya, Turkey. Her Circassian mother, Faika Özer writes poetry and novels, with a release of more than ten books. Aydilge passed the entrance exam to the TRT Radio Children's Choir (TRT Radyosu Çocuk Korusu) when she was eight years old. At the age of 14 she was given her first electric guitar and started composing her own songs. Later she performed in bars while she attended secondary school at Türk Eğitim Derneği Ankara Koleji.  Having completed her studies at the American Culture and Literature in Başkent University in Ankara with flying colours, she moved to Istanbul. Aydilge studied Radio, Television and Cinema at Istanbul University.

Writer

Aydilge published her first volume of short stories in 1998 under the title Kalemimin Ucundaki Düşler (Thoughts From My Pen). Her first novel, Bulimia Sokağı (Bulemia Street), published in 2002 was followed by Altın Aşk Vuruşu (The Thrust of Golden Love) in 2004.

Works
 Kalemimin Ucundaki Düşler. Toplumsal Dönüşüm Yayınları, 1998. (short story)
 Bulimia Sokağı. Remzi Kitabevi, 2002 (novel)
 Altın Aşk Vuruşu. Everest Yayınları, 2004 (novel)
 Aşk Notası. Artemis Yayınları, 2011 (novel)

Musician
Aydilge's first album, entitled Küçük Şarkı Evreni (Small Song Universe), was released in April 2006 by EMI. The songs are a curious mixture of rock music and Eastern melodies. The lyrics were written and the music composed by Aydilge.

Albums
Küçük Şarkı Evreni (Small Song Universe), 2006, EMI
 Bu Gece Ben Ay (Tonight I'm the Moon) 3:35
 Tuğyan 3:51
 Yalnız Değilsin (You Are Not Alone) 3:39
 Yanıyor (Burning) 3:31
 Postmodern Aşk (Postmodern Love) 2:41
 Çal (Play) 4:16
 Şiir (Poem) 3:58
 Gece (Night) 3:16
 Ninni (Lullaby) 3:37
 Ay Aynamdır (The Moon Is My Mirror) 3:37

Sobe, 2009
 Yollara Düşsem
 Kalbim Hep Senle
 Geri Dönmem
 Yükseldin
 Küçük Bir Renk
 Canımla
 Ah Bir Sevse
 Güneş
 Benim Aklım Sende

Kilit, 2011
 Kilit
 Takıntı
 Kum
 Aşk Lazım
 Söyle
 Yollara Düşsem
 Kalbim Hep Senle
 Küçük Bir Renk
 Güneş
 Geri Dönmem

Yalnızlıkla Yaptım, 2013
 Intro – Yükseliş
 Aşk Paylaşılmaz
 Yine Ben Aşık Oldum
 Yalnızlıkla Yaptım
 İstanbul
 Aşk Acı Sever
 Haberin Yok
 Akıllı Bir Deli
 Demode
 Sorma

Kendi Yoluma Gidiyorum, 2018
 Yeni Başlayanlar İçin Aşk
 Sonsuz Sevgilim
 Kendi Yoluma Gidiyorum
 Yana Yana
 Akşam Çöktü Kalbime
 Oyunbozan
 Hüzün Ülkesi
 Kusura Bak, Bilerek Oldu
 Gece Uyku Tutmazsa
 Sade Şarkı
 Gel Sarıl Bana

Evden Canlı Canlı, Vol. 2, 2020
 Sen misin İlacım? (Acoustic)
 Yalnız Değilsin (Acoustic)
 Bahçalarda Mor Meni (Gaziantep Yolunda) [Acoustic]
 Uzun İnce Bir Yoldayım (Acoustic)
 Aşk Yüzünden (Acoustic)
 Hayat Şaşırtır! (Acoustic)
 Gülmek Mümkün mü? (Acoustic)
 Sade Şarkı (Acoustic)
 Akşam Çöktü Kalbime (Acoustic)

Singles
 2010: Takıntı
 2011: Akıllı Bir Deli
 2011: Sorma
 2012: Kaçsam Ege'ye
 2014: Aşka Gel
 2015: Yangın Var
 2015: Gelevera Deresi
 2015: Kiralık Aşk (Sen misin İlacım?)
 2016: Gel Sarıl Bana
 2016: Aşk Olmak
 2017: Yo Yo Yo
 2018: Gece Uyku Tutmazsa
 2019: Aşk Yüzünden (feat. Halil Sezai)
 2019: Hayat Şaşırtır!
 2019: Bir Ayda Unutursun (with Sehabe)
 2020: Yalnızlık Masalı
 2020: Nasıl İnansam?
 2020: Bir Kedim Var
 2021: Parmak İzlerin (feat. Birol Namoğlu)
 2021: Bal Gibi
 2022: Gecenin Haberi Var (Tuna Kiremitçi ve Arkadaşları, Vol. 3)

References

External links
 Aydilge Official Site (TR)
 Aydilge Official Forum (TR)
 Sabanci University School of Languages Podcasts: Interview with Aydilge, 71 minutes (TR)
 Milliyet – Aydilge Sarp

1979 births
People from Kütahya
Living people
Turkish women poets
Turkish women writers
Turkish singer-songwriters
Turkish people of Circassian descent
21st-century Turkish singers
21st-century Turkish women singers